Mandharam is an Indian Malayalam-language romance film directed by Vijesh Vijay and scripted by M. Sajas, with Asif Ali in the lead role. The film was produced by Monisha Rajeev and Tinu Thomas under the banner of Magic Mountain Cinemas.

Plot
The film will have Asif Ali in five looks. The story spans 25-plus years – from the protagonist's childhood to his life at 32. So, Asif will be seen in different appearances in each stage of the character's life.

Cast
Asif Ali as Rajesh
Anarkali Marikar as Devika 
Jacob Gregory as Tittu
Arjun Ashokan as Renjith
Varsha Bollamma as Charu 
Vineeth Vishwam as Nazer
Arjun Nandhakumar as Roshen
Sandeep Narayanan as police officer
Megha Mathew
K. B. Ganesh Kumar as Rajesh's Father
Kausalya as Rajesh's Mother
Srikanth Murali as Charu's Uncle
Unni Dev as Cameo Appearance
Indrans
Karthika Kannan
Badri Krishna
Krittika Pradeep

Production
Mandaram was produced by Monisha Rajeev and Tinu Thomas under the company Magic Mountain Cinemas.

Mandharam will be music-oriented and will also mark the debut of composer Mujeeb Majeed.

References

External links

2010s Malayalam-language films
Indian family films
Indian romance films
2018 romance films